Dilip Saikia Sonowal (1953 - 9 December 2016) was an Indian politician who served as a minister for Assam as a member of Asom Gana Parishad (AGP). He was elected as a Member of the Legislative Assembly from the Dhemaji district for four consecutive terms, from 1985 to 2001.

References 

Assam MLAs 1985–1991
Asom Gana Parishad politicians
2016 deaths
1953 births
Assam MLAs 1996–2001